CEN/TC 10 (CEN Technical Committee 10) is a technical decision making body within the CEN system working on the establishment of safety rules for the construction and installation of lifts, escalators, and passenger conveyors in the European Union.

CEN/TC 10 was created on 01.01.1962 and Working Groups (WG) established under this Technical Committee are:
 WG1: Lifts and service lifts
 WG2: Escalators and moving walks
 WG3: Fire testing of lift landing doors
 WG4: Data logging and remote control
 WG5: Maintenance
 WG6: Fire related issues
 WG7: Accessibility to lifts for persons including persons with disability
 WG8: Stairlifts and vertical platforms for the disabled
 WG9: Inclined lifts
 WG10: Improvement of safety of existing lifts
 WG12: Lifting tables
 WG13: Vertical lifting appliance with enclosed carrier

See also
 List of CEN technical committees
 List of EN standards

References

CEN technical committees
EN standards